Mari Beyleryan (23 March 1877 – 24 April 1915) was an Armenian feminist activist, writer, and public figure and a victim of the Armenian genocide.

Biography 
Mari graduated from the Esayan college of Constantinople, then studied at the studio of Bera. She contributed to various journals including Arevelk and Hunchak. Facing arrest for her participation in the 1895 Bab Ali demonstrations, Beyleryan was forced to flee to Egypt from her native Constantinople.

During her time in Alexandria she taught at a local Armenian school and between 1902 and 1903 she published the Artemis, an Armenian women's journal that ran from January 1902 to December 1903. Beyleryan accepted submissions not only from famous writers but from Armenian women throughout the diaspora. She was especially interested in the role Armenian women would play in the development of national identity. Editorials authored by Beyleryan explored several women's rights themes, including motherhood. She believed women's education and employment were central to Armenian national development.

Beyleryan returned to Constantinople only after the Ottoman Constitution of 1908 was put in place following the Young Turk Revolution. She continued to work as a teacher in Smyrna and later at TokatArmenian school until 1915, when she died in the Armenian genocide.

Sources

Further reading

 

1877 births
1915 deaths
Writers from Istanbul
Armenians from the Ottoman Empire
People who died in the Armenian genocide
Place of death missing
19th-century writers from the Ottoman Empire
20th-century writers from the Ottoman Empire
19th-century Armenian women writers
20th-century Armenian women writers
19th-century women writers from the Ottoman Empire
20th-century women writers from the Ottoman Empire